Roy MacLaren (12 February 1930 – 25 September 2022) was a Scottish professional footballer who played as a goalkeeper.

Career
Born in Auchterarder, MacLaren played for St Johnstone, Bury and Sheffield Wednesday.

References

1930 births
2022 deaths
Scottish footballers
Association football goalkeepers
Scottish Football League players
English Football League players
St Johnstone F.C. players
Bury F.C. players
Sheffield Wednesday F.C. players
Footballers from Perth and Kinross
Aston Villa F.C. non-playing staff